The 36th Ronde van Nederland cycling race was held from August 27 to August 31, 1996. The race started in Gouda (South Holland) and finished after 880.2 kilometres in Landgraaf (Limburg).

Stages

27-08-1996: Gouda-Haarlem, 167 km

28-08-1996: Haarlem-Almere, 195 km

29-08-1996: Almere-Doetinchem, 125 km

29-08-1996: Doetinchem-Doetinchem (Time Trial), 19.6 km

30-08-1996: Zevenaar-Venray, 187 km

31-08-1996: Roermond-Landgraaf, 202 km

Final classification

External links
Wielersite Results

Ronde van Nederland
1996 in road cycling
Ronde